The Niagara Falls Public Library is a public library system in the Canadian city of Niagara Falls, Ontario. The library offers various events, for example screenings of documentaries.

Branches
The library system has four branches.

Victoria Avenue Library: 4848 Victoria Avenue
Community Centre Library: 7150 Montrose Road
Stamford Centre Library: Town and Country Plaza, 3643 Portage Road
Chippawa Library: 3763 Main Street

The system also has a vending machine located at the Gale Centre from which patrons may borrow books and magazines.

References

External links

Niagara Falls, Ontario
Public libraries in Ontario